Taxoid 14beta-hydroxylase is an enzyme with systematic name 10beta-hydroxytaxa-4(20),11-dien-5alpha-yl-acetate,NADPH:oxygen 14-oxidoreductase. This enzyme catalyses the following chemical reaction

 10beta-hydroxytaxa-4(20),11-dien-5alpha-yl acetate + O2 + NADPH + H+  10beta,14beta-dihydroxytaxa-4(20),11-dien-5alpha-yl acetate + NADP+ + H2O

Taxoid 14beta-hydroxylase requires cytochrome P450.

References

External links 
 

EC 1.14.13